Deep Creek State Park may refer to:

 Deep Creek State Forest, a state forest in St. Johns County, Florida
 Deep Creek Preserve, in DeSoto County, Florida
 Deep Creek Conservation Area, an area of protected lands in St. Johns County and Putnam County, Florida